, also known as  or NJA, is a Japanese aviation services company that operates scheduled air service between Niigata and Sado Island, as well as flight training and other services from its headquarters at Kagoshima Airport.

History

NJA began scheduled service between Niigata and Sado in February 2011. 
NJA suspended the route for eleven days in July 2012 after its Islander aircraft struck a car while taxiing at Niigata Airport. NJA suspended the route again in February 2013 due to a faulty generator indicator on its Islander aircraft, which could only be fixed by importing special components. The service resumed in August 2013. It is the only airline currently providing scheduled service to Sado Island, although other scheduled operators have served the airport in the past.

Scheduled destinations
 Niigata Airport
 Sado Airport

Non-scheduled destinations / Charter flights
 Kagoshima Airport
 Satsuma Iōjima Airport
 Miyazaki Airport
 Kumamoto Airport
 Amakusa Airport
 Kitakyushu Airport
 Nagasaki Airport
 Oita Airport

Fleet
 Four Cessna 172
 One Britten-Norman Islander

References

External links 

Official website 

Airlines of Japan
1969 establishments in Japan